Robert Francis may refer to:

Robert Francis (MP), Member of Parliament for Staffordshire, c.1400
Robert Francis (barrister) (born 1950), British barrister specialising in medical law
Robert Francis (musician) (born 1987), American singer/songwriter and producer
Robert Francis (poet) (1901–1987), American poet
Robert Francis (actor) (1930–1955), American actor
Robert Francis (writer) (1909–1946), French writer, winner of the 1934 Prix Femina
Bobby Francis (born 1958), former ice hockey head coach
Bob Francis (radio presenter) (1939–2016), talk back radio presenter for FIVEaa in South Australia
Bob Francis (referee) (born 1942), New Zealand rugby union referee and mayor
Robert Francis "Beto" O'Rourke (born 1972), American politician
Robert Francis (politician), British politician and hotelier

See also